March of the Tadpoles was the fifth studio recording of the Toshiko Akiyoshi – Lew Tabackin Big Band.  The album was released in Japan in 1977 by Baystate. The album received two 1985 Grammy award nominations – for "Best Jazz Instrumental Performance - Big Band" and for "Best Arrangement on an Instrumental" (for the song, "March of the Tadpoles").

All tracks from this album are also included on the 2008 Mosaic 3 CD compilation, Mosaic Select: Toshiko Akiyoshi - Lew Tabackin Big Band.

Track listing
All songs composed and arranged by Toshiko Akiyoshi:
LP side A
"March of the Tadpoles" – 6:54
"Mobile" – 5:20
"Deracinated Flower" – 8:14
LP side B
"Yellow is Mellow" –  8:53
"Notorious Tourist from the East" –  7:35

Personnel
Toshiko Akiyoshi – piano
Lew Tabackin – tenor saxophone and flute
Tom Peterson – tenor saxophone
Dick Spencer – alto saxophone
Gary Foster – alto saxophone
Bill Perkins – baritone saxophone
Steven Huffsteter – trumpet
Bobby Shew – trumpet
Mike Price – trumpet
Richard Cooper – trumpet
Charlie Loper – trombone
Bill Reichenbach Jr. – trombone
Rick Culver – trombone
Phil Teele – bass trombone
Don Baldwin – bass
Peter Donald – drums

Guest artist:
Emil Richards – percussion (on "Notorious Tourist from the East")

References / External Links
RCA Victor Records RVC RVP-6178
Ascent Records ASC 1005
[ Allmusic]
1985 Grammy nominations, Best Jazz Instrumental Performance - Big Band and (for the song, "March of the Tadpoles") Best Arrangement on an Instrumental (LA Times link)

Toshiko Akiyoshi – Lew Tabackin Big Band albums
1977 albums
Baystate Records albums